Grooverider Presents: The Prototype Years is a drum and bass compilation album by DJ Grooverider. It was released in 1997 on his label, Prototype Recordings.
 
A second CD containing a DJ mix of every track on the first CD, including 4 other tracks released on Prototype Recordings, was included with the CD version of the album. "Subway" by Ed Rush appears on the compilation vinyl disc, but not on the compilation CD, for unknown reasons. "Subway" is later included in the DJ mix CD.

Track listing
First Cd / Vinyl 1:

Codename John - Dreams of Heaven
John B - Secrets
Optical - Grey Odyssey
Matrix - Mute
Codename John - Deep inside
Dillinja - Silver Blade
Ed Rush & Fierce - Locust
Codename John - Warned
Boymerang - Still
Lemon D - City Lights
 
Mix CD / Vinyl:

Optical - Grey Odyssey
Ed Rush - Subway
Matrix - Mute
Lemon D - Going Gets Tuff (also known as "Going Gets Tough")
John B - Secrets
Dillinja - Silver Blade
Codename John - Dreams of Heaven
Boymerang - Still
Cybotron feat. Dillinja - Threshold
Codename John - Deep Inside
Ed Rush & Fierce - Locust
Lemon D - City Lights
Codename John - Warned
Boymerang, Dom & Roland, Optical - Still VIP Mix

References

1997 albums
Grooverider albums